Don't Grieve is a 1969 Soviet comedy film directed by Georgiy Daneliya. Film is loosely based on the novel "My uncle Benjamen" by French writer Claude Tillier.

Plot 
In the end of the 19th century, a young doctor, Benjamen Glonti, returns to a small village in his native Georgia after finishing his medical studies in St. Petersburg. A series of comic events unfold around him.

Cast 
 Sergo Zakariadze as Doctor Levan Tsintsadze
 Vakhtang Kikabidze as Doctor Benjamen Glonti
 Sofiko Chiaureli as Sofico, Benjamen's sister
 Anastasiya Vertinskaya as Mery Tsintsadze, Levan's daughter
 Lia Gudadze as Margo, Vano's wife
 Veriko Anjaparidze as Kalandadze's mother  
 Sesilia Takaishvili as Aunt Domna
 Ariadna Shengelaia as Princess Vahvari 
 Gogi Kavtaradze as Luka, Sofico's husband
Ipolite Khvichia as Sandro, organ-grinder
 Karlo Sakandelidze as Dodo, lawyer
 Dodo Abashidze as Prince Vahvari
 Zurab Kapianidze as His servant

Music 
In the film, Kikabidze performs Shen Khar Venakhi, a medieval Georgian hymn.

Awards

References

External links 

1960s Russian-language films
Georgian-language films
1969 comedy films
1969 films
Soviet comedy films
Films based on French novels
Mosfilm films
Soviet-era films from Georgia (country)
Comedy films from Georgia (country)
1960s multilingual films
Multilingual films from Georgia (country)
Soviet multilingual films